Pascal Robert Boyer is a French-American cognitive anthropologist and evolutionary psychologist, mostly known for his work in the cognitive science of religion. He taught at the University of Cambridge for eight years, before taking up the position of Henry Luce Professor of Individual and Collective Memory at Washington University in St. Louis, where he teaches classes on evolutionary psychology and anthropology. He was a Guggenheim Fellow and a visiting professor at the University of California, Santa Barbara and the University of Lyon, France. He studied philosophy and anthropology at University of Paris and Cambridge, with Jack Goody, working on memory constraints on the transmission of oral literature. Boyer is a Member of the American Academy of Arts and Sciences.

Work
Pascal Boyer, an anthropologist, studies how human biases and cognitive faculties have resulted in or encouraged cultural phenomena. He advocates the idea that human evolution resulted in specialized capacities that guide our social relations, culture, and predilections toward religious beliefs. Boyer and others propose that these cognitive mechanisms make the acquisition of “religious” themes, like concepts of spirits, ghosts, ancestors or gods, highly transmissible within a community.

Boyer has conducted long-term ethnographic fieldwork in Cameroon, where he studied the transmission of Fang oral epics and its traditional religion. Most of his later work consists of an experimental study of cognitive capacities underlying cultural transmission. He also conducted studies on supernatural concepts and their retention in memory and a general description of cognitive processes involved in the transmission of religious concepts. More recently, he has written on the concept of Folk economics, which proposes that evolved cognitive biases play an important role in how laypeople view the economy.

Religion Explained 
Of Boyer's books, Religion Explained: The Evolutionary Origins of Religious Thought is the best known. Boyer introduced cognitive anthropology, which provided a new understanding of religion. Religion for Boyer consists of cultural representations, that is, ideas that appear in roughly similar forms in the minds of different individuals in a group. To explain how religion emerges and is transmitted, we must explain how these ideas are acquired, stored and transmitted better than other possible ideas. Findings from cognitive and developmental psychology suggest that some combinations of ideas are particularly easy to acquire and remember. Among these, we find many standard themes of supernatural and religious imagination, such as the notion of an agent with counter-intuitive physics and standard psychology, e.g. ghosts and gods that are not material but have the same mental capacities as humans. According to Boyer, there are only a few such combinations of intuitive and counter-intuitive material that are optimal for acquisition and memory - and these happen to be the most frequent ones in the world's religions.

In this cognitive paradigm belief in supernatural agents is natural and part of human cognition.  However, religion is not "special". That is, there are no specific mental systems that create religious ideas. Rather, these ideas are an expected by-product of mental systems that evolved for other reasons, not for religion. For instance, we easily entertain the notion of a "god" or "ghost" because of our intuitive psychology, what psychologists sometimes call "Theory of Mind". 

Justin L. Barrett has argued that Boyer’s book, The Naturalness of Religious Ideas: A Cognitive Theory of Religion is an attempt to reform traditional models and allow understanding religion in terms of cognitive science. Boyer dismantles many traditional assumptions of cultural studies. However, Barrett claims, Boyer lacks clarity – mostly due to the shift in anthropological to psychological jargon.

Minds Make Societies 
In this book, Boyer explains the relevance of evolutionary psychology and cultural evolution to understanding human societies, from the small-scale communities in which humans evolved to modern mass-societies. The blurb states that the book "integrates insights from evolutionary biology, genetics, psychology, economics, and more to explore the development and workings of human societies".

In Boyer's view, this new integrated social science can provide new answers, based on scientific evidence, to important questions about society. Each of the six chapters in the book focuses on one of these questions: (1) Why do humans favor their own group?, (2) Why do people communicate so much wrong information (rumors, superstition, etc.)?, (3) Why are there religions?, (4) What is the natural family?, (5) How can societies be just? and (6) Can human minds understand human societies?

One running theme in the book is that social sciences can progress if they abandon "chimerical" notions like "nature" and "culture", that do not correspond to anything in the world. Social scientists should also abandon classical assumptions that name problems instead of solving them, like the idea that power is similar to a force, or that social norms exist outside the heads of human beings. 

Boyer recommends the kind of "consilient" social science outlined by E.O. Wilson, and he argues that we already have the elements of such a social science, as illustrated in his book.

Books

Religion Explained: The Evolutionary Origins of Religious Thought (2001) Basic Books. .
Translated into Greek as Και ο Άνθρωπος Έπλασε τους Θεούς, by Dimitris Xygalatas and Nikolas Roubekas.
Translated into Polish as “I człowiek stworzył bogów… Jak powstała religia?”.
Translated into Russian as "Объясняя религию. Природа религиозного мышления"
Memory Mind and Culture. Edited by Pascal Boyer and James V. Wertsch. New York: Cambridge University Press. 2009.
Cognitive Aspects Of Religious Symbolism. Edited by Pascal Boyer. Cambridge: Cambridge University Press. 1992.
The Fracture of an Illusion: Science and the Dissolution of Religion. Vandenhoeck & Ruprecht August 23, 2010.
 Minds Make Societies, New Haven: Yale University Press, 2018,

See also
 Evolutionary origin of religions
 Evolutionary epistemology
 Evolutionary psychology
 Faith and rationality
 Memetics
 Relationship between religion and science
 Cognitive science of religion
 Evolutionary psychology of religion
 Cognitive anthropology
 Folk economics

Notes and references

External links
Boyer's website
“Why Is Religion Natural?”, Skeptical Inquirer, Volume 28.2, March/April 2004
Book review: Religion Explained, by Pascal Boyer 

Year of birth missing (living people)
Living people
Washington University in St. Louis faculty
French anthropologists
Cognitive science of religion